"Today's the Day" is a pop song written and recorded by American singer-songwriter Pink to serve as the new theme song for season 13 of The Ellen DeGeneres Show. The song was co-written and produced by Greg Kurstin. It was released to digital retailers as an official single on September 10, 2015, through RCA Records and Warner Bros.

Composition
"Today's the Day" is a song written by Pink and Greg Kurstin with inspirational lyrics about seizing the day and not wanting to let it end. The song has been praised for combining Pink's signature sound with the show's "feel-good vibe", but has also been noted as overly-familiar thematic territory for the singer.

Live performances
Pink performed the song live on the September 10, 2015 episode of The Ellen DeGeneres Show, which for premiere week was being shot in New York City.

Charts

Weekly charts

Year-end charts

Certifications

References

2015 songs
2015 singles
Pink (singer) songs
RCA Records singles
Television talk show theme songs
Songs written by Pink (singer)
Songs written by Greg Kurstin
Song recordings produced by Greg Kurstin
The Ellen DeGeneres Show